Major (Dr.) Albert Nwazu Okonkwo was briefly the Military Administrator of the Mid-Western State of Nigeria in mid-1967 during an attempt to establish the region as the independent Republic of Benin early in the Nigerian Civil War.
Okonkwo was a Major in the Biafran Army Medical Corps.
He was trained as a physician in the United States, and was married to an American.

Life
Okonkwo was a medical doctor and was the CO of the Nigerian Armed Forces Medical Service in Benin right before the Civil War. At the onset of the war, he became one of the top ranked rebel commanders in the Mid-West region that later became briefly known as Republic of Benin by rebel leaders.

On 9 August 1967 a force of 3,000 Biafran troops crossed the Niger bridge, with one group making a dash for Benin City. On 14 August the Biafran command in Enugu announced that Major Okonkwo had been appointed Military Administrator of the Mid-Western Region. The new administration faced resistance from several segments of the population.
Morale was poor. The Liberation Army commander, a Yoruba colonel named Victor Banjo, and three majors were later discovered to have been negotiating with the Nigerian army, were tried for high treason and executed by firing squad in Enugu.

The Nigerian Army regrouped and advanced towards Benin city under the leadership of Colonel Murtala Mohammed, recapturing the city on 20 September 1967. The day before, Okonkwo had been declared Governor of the "autonomous, independent and sovereign republic of Benin".
In his broadcast declaring the independent Republic of Benin, Okonkwo belatedly tried to rally non-Igbo groups.
After the city fell, Okonkwo was thought to have fled to Igbo areas near Ubiaja.

References

Year of birth missing (living people)
Living people
Igbo people
Heads of state of former countries
Nigerian generals
Nigerian military doctors
Biafran Armed Forces personnel